The Other Me may refer to:

 The Other Me (2000 film), a 2000 Disney Channel Original Movie
 The Other Me (2016 film), a 2016 Greek film directed by Sotiris Tsafoulias
 The Other Me (2022 film), a 2022 American film directed by Giga Agladze
 "The Other Me" (song), by Paul McCartney